Rubus reflexus is a Chinese species of brambles in the rose family. It has been found only in China (Provinces of Fujian, Guangdong, Guangxi, Guizhou, Hubei, Hunan, Jiangxi, Taiwan, Yunnan, and Zhejiang).

Rubus reflexus is a prickly shrub up to 2 meters (80 inches) tall. Leaves are simple (not compound), palmately lobed, covered with hairs. Flowers are white. Fruits are red.

References

reflexus
Plants described in 1820
Flora of China